David Pontarini, OAA, AAA, FRAIC, AIA is a Canadian architect and founding partner of Hariri Pontarini Architects in 1994, alongside Siamak Hariri.

Pontarini is a former member of the City of Toronto’s Design Review Panel, the City of Toronto’s Preservation Board, a visiting lecturer at the University of Toronto Faculty of Architecture, Landscape and Design, and a former member of the OAA Council, representing Toronto Centre from 1992 to 2002.

Honours
Royal Architecture Institute of Canada's (RAIC) 2013 Architectural Firm Award

Work in Progress 
Pinnacle One Yonge, Toronto, Ontario, Canada
The Well, Toronto, Ontario, Canada
19 Duncan Street, Toronto, Ontario, Canada
PJ Condos, Toronto, Ontario, Canada
Edmonton Ice District, Edmonton, Alberta, Canada

Buildings of Note
2019: Massey Tower, Toronto, Ontario, Canada
2019: King Portland Centre and Kingly Condos, Toronto, Ontario, Canada
2018: One Bloor, Toronto, Ontario, Canada
2018: 7 St. Thomas, Toronto, Ontario, Canada
2017: FIVE: Condos at 5 St. Joseph, Toronto, Ontario, Canada
2016: Pinnacle on Adelaide, Toronto, Ontario, Canada
2013: Shangri-La Toronto, Ontario, Canada
1999: McKinsey & Co. Toronto, Ontario, Canada
1998: Robertson House Crisis Care Centre, Toronto, Ontario, Canada

Publications
2005: "Yorkville Condo Has Historic Link." Toronto Star 23 July 2005
2006: Ogilvie, Megan. "New VÜ for ‘Old Town’." Toronto Star 20 May 2006
2007: Hume, Christopher. " Some Causes for Concern in Condo Design." Toronto Star 21 April 2007
2010: Topping, David, Let’s Gape at One Bloor, Shall we?", Torontoist, April 2010
2010: Van de Ven, Lisa, "One Bloor", National Post, April 2010
2010: Daily Commercial News, “Work Continues on Shangri-la Toronto hotel and residences.” Construction Overview, June 2010
2011: Pontarini talks One Bloor design in Urbantoronto.ca

See also
 Architecture of Toronto

References

External links
Hariri Pontarini Architects

Canadian architects
Living people
Year of birth missing (living people)